Lucas Edwin Babin (born July 30, 1979) is an American attorney, actor, and fashion model who has served as district attorney of Tyler County, Texas since 2019. As an actor, Babin was noted for playing Spider in School of Rock (2003).

Early life and education 
Babin was born on July 30, 1979 in Beaumont, Texas. Babin is the son of Republican Congressman Brian Babin and the brother of Extreme Ownership author, Leif Babin.

He earned a Bachelor of Arts degree from Sam Houston State University and a Juris Doctor from the University of Houston Law School.

Acting and modeling career 
He is known for playing Spider in the Paramount Pictures film, School of Rock, and has appeared in worldwide advertisements for Gucci, Versace, Versace Jeans Couture, CK, Calvin Klein, Roberto Cavalli, Just Cavalli, GAP, Louis Vuitton, and other top fashion brands.

Babin is the only American to star in a Brazilian telenovela, appearing in 67 episodes of the series América, on the Globo Network. He speaks Portuguese fluently. Babin was Paris Hilton's love interest in the music video "Stars Are Blind", as well as the knight in shining armor and boyfriend of Alanis Morissette in the 2002 music video for "Precious Illusions".

Legal career 
After completing law school, Babin went to work with Sutliff & Stout, Injury and Accident Law Firm. After several years in Houston, Babin moved back to his hometown Woodville, Texas. In 2018, Babin ran for and was elected as the district attorney of Tyler County, Texas.

As district attorney, Babin indicted Netflix for allegedly distributing lewd content through the release of Cuties (2020), which garnered controversy over its depiction of pre-adolescent girls. According to Variety, commentators have suggested that the suit stands to boost Babin's political standing to prepare for a run for higher office.

Filmography

Film

Television

References

External links

Male actors from Texas
American male film actors
American male television actors
County district attorneys in Texas
People from Beaumont, Texas
1979 births
Living people
American twins
University of Houston Law Center alumni
Male models from Texas